Engl is a German language habitational surname for someone from Anglia. Notable people with the name include:

 Birgit Engl (born 1979), Austrian handball player
 Heinz Engl (1953), Austrian mathematician
 Josef Benedikt Engl (1867–1907), German caricaturist and illustrator\
 Kurt Engl (born 1979), Austrian alpine skier
 Maximilian Engl (1997), German professional footballer
 Olga Engl (1871–1946), Austrian-German stage and motion picture actress

See also 
 Engl (disambiguation)
 Engel (surname) 
 Engels (surname)
 Engelman 
 Engelmann

References 

German-language surnames
Ethnonymic surnames
German toponymic surnames